TMN is an abbreviation for:
 Telecommunications Management Network, a network protocol
 Telecomunicações Móveis Nacionais, SA, a Portuguese telecom
 Texas Moratorium Network, an advocacy organization dealing with the death penalty
 The Morning News, an online magazine
 The Movie Network, a Canadian television network
 The Music Network, an Australian magazine and charts company
 TM Network, aka TMN (1990–1994), Japanese pop band
 TMN Group plc, an email marketing company
 TrackMania Nations, a computer game
 Tuberomammillary nucleus, a part of the hypothalamus